Brigadoon is a neighborhood in southeastern Lexington, Kentucky, United States. its boundaries are Reynolds Road to the north, Lansdowne Drive to the east, Wilson Downing Road to the south, and Nicholasville Road to the west.

Neighborhood statistics

 Area: 
 Population: 664
 Population density: 3,238 people per square mile
 Median household income: $46,211

References

Neighborhoods in Lexington, Kentucky